Nanjing North railway station is an under construction railway station located in Pukou District, Nanjing, Jiangsu, China. On opening it will be the third railway hub in Nanjing, following Nanjing railway station and Nanjing South railway station.

History
In June 2019, it was stated that Nanjing North railway station would be completed by 2025.

Construction officially started on 28 December 2020.

Metro station
Nanjing North railway station will be served by Lines 3, 4, 15, 18, and S4 of Nanjing Metro.

References 

Railway stations in Jiangsu